Offagna is a comune (municipality) in the Province of Ancona in the Italian region of Marche, about  southwest of Ancona.

Offagna borders the following municipalities: Ancona, Osimo, Polverigi.

Demographic evolution

References

Cities and towns in the Marche